V.B.Z. d.o.o. is a Croatian publishing company including bookstores and online sale.

About
The publishing company was founded in 1991 and includes bookstores and online sale with branches in Bosnia and Herzegovina (since 2003), Slovenia (since 2002) and Serbia (since 2007). The headquarters is located in Zagreb. The publishing assortment consists of publications on health, alternative medicine, esoteric literature, popular psychology, cooking, household and garden, popular science, natural science, economics, informatics, atlases, dictionaries, travel guide books, linguistics, literary theory, poetry as well as prose of contemporary authors and English-speaking editions. Currently, the Croatian company is owner of bookstores in Zagreb, Velika Gorica, Rijeka, Slavonski Brod, Čakovec, Split, Solin and Zadar. The founder and proprietor of the publishing house was the well respected entrepreneur Boško Zatezalo who died in 2014.

V.B.Z. Award
The publishing house encourages, supports and promotes young or partially unknown writers with this literary prize, which has been awarded annually (excepting 2012, 2013 and 2017) for the Best Unpublished Novel of the Year since 2002. The submitted manuscript must be written in Croatian or Shtokavian as well as the Chakavian and Kajkavian literary language. 

Laureates
 2002 Josip Mlakić for Živi i mrtvi.
 2003 Jelena Marković for Escajg za teletinu and Marinko Koščec for Wonderland.
 2004 Davor Špišić for Koljivo.
 2005 Nura Bazdulj-Hubijar for Kad je bio juli.
 2006 Hrvoje Šalković for Pravi se da ovo nisi vidio.
 2007 Svjetlana Gjoni for Nula nemo. 
 2008 Predrag Crnković for Beograd za pokojnike. 
 2009 Dragan Pavelić for Proljeće u Karolinentalu.  
 2010 Aleksandar Novaković for Vođa.
 2011 Ankica Tomić for Naročito ljeti.
 2014 Ivica Prtenjača for Brdo.
 2015 Marina Vujčić for Susjed.
 2016 Lada Vukić for Specijalna potreba and Ivica Ivanišević for Knjiga žalbe.
 2018 Marina Šur Puhlovski for Divljakuša.
 2019 Olja Raičević-Knežević for Katarina, velika i mala.

References 

Publishing companies of Croatia
Publishing companies established in 1991
Companies based in Zagreb
Croatian companies established in 1991